is a Japanese speed skater. She competed in three events at the 1960 Winter Olympics.

References

External links

1939 births
Living people
Japanese female speed skaters
Olympic speed skaters of Japan
Speed skaters at the 1960 Winter Olympics
Sportspeople from Nagano Prefecture